Scolytocis samoensis is a species of beetle in the family Ciidae, the only species in the genus Scolytocis.

References

Monotypic Cucujiformia genera
Ciidae genera